The Chong Jargylchak is a river in Jeti-Ögüz District of Issyk-Kul Region of Kyrgyzstan. It rises on north slopes of Teskey Ala-Too Range and flows into lake Issyk-Kul.

References

Rivers of Kyrgyzstan
Tributaries of Issyk-Kul